Mansour (Manṣūr); also spelled Mounsor, Monsur (Bengali), Mansoor, Manser, Mansur, Mansyur (Indonesian) or Mensur (Turkish), is a male Arabic name that means "He who is victorious", from  the Arabic root naṣr (نصر), meaning "victory."

The first known bearer of the name was  Al-Mansur, second Abbasid caliph and the founder of Baghdad.

Other people called Mansour during the golden Age of Islam include:

 Ismail al-Mansur, third ruler of the Fatimid dynasty ruled from 946 to 953.
 Mansur Al-Hallaj, Persian mystic, writer, and teacher of Sufism
 Almanzor, 10th-century ruler of al-Andalus
 Mansur ibn Ilyas, Timurid physician
 Mansur Khan (Moghul Khan), a khan of Moghulistan
 Mansur Shah of Malacca, a sultan of Malacca
 Mansur I of Samanid and Mansur II of Samanid, amirs of the Samanids
 Mansur ad-Din of Adal, 15th-century sultan of Adal.

Imams of Yemen

 Al-Mansur Yahya (d. 976)
 Al-Mansur Abdallah (1166-1217)
 Al-Mansur al-Hasan (1199–1271) 
 Al-Mansur an-Nasir (d. 1462)
 Al-Mansur Muhammad, Imam of Yemen (1441-1505)
 Al-Mansur al-Husayn  (1669 - 1720) 
 Al-Mansur Ali I (1738-1809)
 Al-Mansur Ahmad (d. 1853)
 Al-Mansur Ali II, Imam of Yemen (1812 - 1871) 
 Al-Mansur al-Husayn III (d.1888)

Modern given name
Mansur or Mansour is used in Turkic languages, Iranian languages and Arabic, while the transliteration Mansoor is typically used by South Asians, and Mensur is used in the Bosnian language.

Mansur
 Mansur Yavaş, Turkish politician and the mayor of Ankara
 Sheikh Mansur, Chechen leader against Catherine the Great's Russia
 Mansur Mozaffarov, Russian Tatar composer and pedagogue
 Mansur Abdulin, Soviet memoirist and soldier

Mensur 

 Mensur Akgün, Turkish scholar
 Mensur Bajramović, Bosnian basketball coach
 Mensur Suljović, professional darts player
 Mensur Kurtiši, Macedonian association football player

Mansoor
 Mansoor Abdullah, Singaporean convicted murderer
 Mansoor Ali Khan Pataudi, Indian cricketer
 Mansoor Al-Shehail, Saudi Arabian professional wrestler 
 Mansoor Ahmed, Pakistani hockey player 
 Mansoor Akhtar, Pakistani cricketer  
 Mansoor Amjad, Pakistani  cricketer
 Mansoor Hekmat, Iranian political theorist and activist
 Mansoor Ijaz, American commentator and businessman
 Mansoor Muhammed Ali Qattaa, Saudi Arabian held in detention in the United States' Guantanamo Bay detention camps
 Mansoor Khan, Pakistani film maker 
 Mullah Bakht Mohammed, military commander for Afghanistan's Taliban known as Mansoor Dadullah
 Mansoor Muftah, Qatari football player 
 Mansoor Ali Khan Pataudi, nawab of Bengal 
 Mansoor Zaman, Pakistani professional squash player

Mansour
 Mansour (singer), Iranian singer
 Mansour Abbas, Arab-Israeli politician
 Mansour F. Armaly, Palestinian-American physician and researcher
 Mansour al-Balawi, Saudi Arabian businessman
 Mansour Bahrami, Iranian tennis player
 Mansour el-Essawi (1937–2023), Egyptian politician 
 Mansour Hassan (1937–2012), Egyptian politician
 Mansour Leghaei, Iranian Shia Imam and Founder of the Imam Husain Islamic Centre
 Mansour Matloubi, Iranian professional poker player
 Mansour bin Zayed Al Nahyan, member of the ruling family of Abu Dhabi in the United Arab Emirates
 Mansour Nariman, Iranian oud player and composer
 Mansour Osanlou, Iranian trade union activist
 Mansour Rahbani, Lebanese composer, musician, and producer
 Mansour Rouhani, Iranian politician
 Mansour bin Abdulaziz Al Saud, Saudi royal and politician
 Mansour bin Mutaib Al Saud, Saudi royal and politician
 Mansour bin Muqrin Al Saud (1974–2017), Saudi royal
 Mansour bin Saud Al Saud, Saudi royal and businessman
 Mansour Seck, Senegalese singer and musician
 Mansour Al-Thagafi, Saudi Arabian footballer
 Mansour Zalzal, Abbasid musician and composer

Similar
 Almanzo Wilder, American farmer, whose first name is a form of al-Manṣūr.
 Mansurul Haq, Pakistani admiral and Chief of Naval Staff of the Pakistan Navy
 Mancur Olson, American economist and political scientist
 Mansyur S., Indonesian Dangdut singer

Surname

Mansour
 Adly Mansour, Egyptian politian and acting President in 2014
 Adnan Mansour, Lebanese diplomat and politician 
 Agnes Mary Mansour, American political figure and former nun
 Ahmed Subhy Mansour, Egyptian cleric, founder of the Quranist group
 Akhtar Mohammad Mansour (1968–2016), leader of the Taliban, in Afghanistan
 Amal Mansour (1950–2018), Palestinian-Jordanian author and translator
 Amir Mansour, American professional boxer
 Eli Mansour, American rabbi, author/writer
 Gueye Mansour, Senegalese footballer
 Hend Al-Mansour, Saudi Arabian-American artist
 Josh Mansour, Australian Rugby League player
 Joyce Mansour, British born Egyptian Surrealist poet who also wrote in French 
 Mustafa Mansour, Egyptian footballer
 Ramadan Abdel Rehim Mansour, Egyptian street gang leader and serial killer 
 Reda Mansour (born 1965), Israeli writer, historian and diplomat
 Richard Mansour, better known as Dick Dale, Lebanese-American guitarist
 Shadia Mansour, British born Palestinian singer
 Sliman Mansour, Palestinian painter
 Toufik Mansour, Israeli mathematician

Mansoor
 Belal Mansoor Ali, Bahraini runner from Kenya
 Ghulam Mansoor, Subedar major, Bhopal state
 M. A. Mansoor, Egyptian antiquarian
 Maghfoor Mansoor, Pakistani native who was a fugitive in the United States
 Misha Mansoor, American musician and founder of the Progressive Metal band Periphery
 Peter Mansoor, Palestinian American Army colonel, executive officer to Gen. Petraeus during Iraq War troop surge of 2007
 Shoaib Mansoor, Pakistani film producer, director, writer, lyricist, and composer

Mansur
 Ali Mansur, prime minister of Iran
 Hassan-Ali Mansur, Iranian politician and prime minister
 João Mansur, Brazilian politician and governor of Lebanese descent
 Jossy Mansur, Aruban newspaper editor of Lebanese descent
 Mallikarjun Mansur, Indian classical singer
 Muhammad Mansur Ali, Bangladeshi politician and prime minister
 Sheikh Mukhtar Robow, leader and spokesman for Somalia's al-Shabaab known as Abu Mansur
 Ustad Mansur, Mughal painter from India

Similar
 Michael A. Monsoor, United States Navy SEAL and Medal of Honor recipient

See also
 Al-Mansur (disambiguation)
 Manzur, a similar sounding yet unrelated name
 Mansura (disambiguation)
 Mansurnagar Union

Arabic masculine given names
Bosniak masculine given names
Turkish masculine given names